Light It Up may refer to:
 Light It Up (film), a 1999 film starring Usher
 Light It Up (soundtrack), the soundtrack to the 1999 drama film, Light It Up
 Light It Up (Rev Theory album), 2008
 "Light It Up" (Rev Theory song)
 "Light It Up", a 2010 single by Blood Red Shoes from their album Fire like This
 "Light It Up" (Stan Walker song), 2011
 "Light It Up", a 2015 song by XO-IQ, featured in the TV series Make It Pop
 "Light It Up", a 2015 song by Badd Dimes and We Are Loud! featuring Sonny Wilson released after an earlier collaboration on "Booyah"
 "Light It Up" (Major Lazer song), 2015
 "Light It Up" (Luke Bryan song), 2017
 "Light It Up" (Marshmello, Tyga and Chris Brown song), 2019
Light It Up, song by Migos and Pop Smoke from Culture III, 2021
 Light It Up (Casey Barnes album), 2022